McArthur Lake is a lake in Ontario, Canada to the south of the city of Timmins. The lake has a rocky shoreline and 13 islands. It is used for recreation in the summer, but freezes in the winter. Due to the harsh climate most of the trees around the lake are conifers. The rocks around the lake have potential for nickel extraction.

Geography

Most of the lake lies in McArthur township, but the eastern part extends into Douglas Township.

Islands in the lake include:

 McArthur Island
 Sharprock Island
 Blueberry Island
 Hidden Island
 Delta Island
 Shadfly Island
 Olyjian Isle
 Diorite Island
 Midway Island
 Crayfish Island
 Cat Island
 Maziic Island
 Taylor's Island

Some of the bays in the lake include:

Leech Bay
East Bay
Theriault Bay
False Bay
Interior Bay

Climate

The lake is in the Hemiboreal climate zone.

Environment

McArthur Lake has a rocky shoreline with three main bays and thirteen islands.
The west side of the lake has more than 20 camps and cottages.
It is used for kayaking, boating and fishing for walleye and northern pike.
The lake is frozen over during the winter.
In July surface water temperatures may reach .
Trees include cedars and poplars, balsam firs and pines of various types, but few deciduous trees.

Total phosphorus concentration was measured at two sites in the lake in 2004–2007.
Average levels were:

Since these all levels are below 10 µg/L the lake is considered oligotrophic and unlikely to experience nuisance algal blooms.

Geology

The lake lies in a zone of ultramafic metavolcanic rocks (Komatiites) known as the Tisdale Assemblage.
The southwest corner crosses a northwesterly trending quartz-bearing diorite sill of intermediate intrusive rocks.
The southern part of the lake is crossed by two diabase dikes of the Sudbury dike swarm.
The dykes have 12% plagioclase, 20% tremolite, 35% clinopyroxene, 8% chlorite, 18% sericite, 3% magnetite and 2% calcium-garnet.
Outcrops of high magnesium ultramafic rocks of the Goose Lake Formation are found south and northwest of the lake.

In the south of the lake, gold is reported to be found, although exploration work has consisted almost entirely of trenching.
The lake is mostly contained within the McArthur Lake Nickel Property owned by Eloro Resources Ltd..

See also
List of lakes in Ontario

Notes

Sources

Lakes of Cochrane District